George Woosnam (1860–1935) was a Welsh international footballer. He was part of the Wales national football team, playing one match on 7 April 1879 against Scotland.

See also
 List of Wales international footballers (alphabetical)

References

1860 births
1935 deaths
Welsh footballers
Wales international footballers
People from Newtown, Powys
Sportspeople from Powys
Association football forwards